Lonemore is a crofting village on the north shore of Gair Loch near the village of Gairloch, Ross-shire,  Scottish Highlands and is in the Scottish council area of Highland. Founded by Sir Francis Alexander Mackenzie, 5th Baronet (1798 - 1843) after his succession to the family title in 1826, by 1856 the village was a model of its kind in contrast to the devastation of the Clearances elsewhere.

References

Populated places in Ross and Cromarty
Gairloch